Zak Keith is a British multi-genred guitarist, based in Stockholm, Sweden, since 1998. He was band leader for Bob Manning's Soul Enterprise until 2001. Active internationally, he has performed with artists such as Angélique Kidjo, Julius E. Green of The Platters, Pete York of Spencer Davis Group, Jon Lord (of Deep Purple), the late "Master" Henry Gibson, the late Malando Gassama, Bernard Purdie and Eric Bibb. He has performed as part of an opening act for, or held various stage-management positions on assignment for, major international various artists, including Leif Garrett, John Farnham, Wilson Pickett, Isaac Hayes, Stevie Wonder and Michael Jackson. He has also appeared on television (in Sweden, Singapore, Turkey and Kurdish exile TV) as a solo artist, with Soul Enterprise, and as a sideman with artists such as Khaled Habib and Zakaria. He was also a notable contributor to the jam sessions at Stampen in 2001.

Zak Keith is also the author of several books, including an autobiographical work titled, My Life as a Squint-Eyed Chink.

Discography
He landed a contract with Warner at age 17, to record with a rock band. He has worked as a sessionist for radio programs and various studios in Australia, the Far East and in Europe, appearing on the albums of various artists.
 Khaled Habib Live — Khaled Habib, 2003
 Nostalgia – Khaled Habib, 2004
 Two in Love — Brad Vee Johnson, 2007
 Shine On You — Dance Beat, EMI Dancebeat Records, 1996
 Love — Annika Ljungberg, Mother Earth Records, 1994
 Gotta Be Loved — Nevada, Warner, 1994
 You Want My Money — Mark Tysper, 1991
 Ice Breakers — Mona Lindberg, 2004
 94-04: 10 År Med Klubb Rock — Compilation album, 2005

References

 ACME magazine (produced by Andersen Consulting - now known as Accenture) Interview, 2002 (Swedish)

Year of birth missing (living people)
Living people
British male guitarists
Soul Enterprise members